John Kincaid (February 15, 1791 – February 7, 1873) was a United States representative from Kentucky. He was born near Danville, Kentucky, where he attended the public schools. He studied law, was admitted to the bar and commenced practice in Stanford, Kentucky.

Kincaid served as a Kentucky Commonwealth attorney. He was also a member of the Kentucky House of Representatives in 1819. He was elected as a Jacksonian to the Twenty-first Congress (March 4, 1829 – March 3, 1831). After leaving Congress, he was again a member of the Kentucky House of Representatives in 1836 and 1837. He served as circuit judge in 1836 and 1837 and then resumed the practice of law and also engaged in agricultural pursuits, He moved to Gallatin, Tennessee, in 1870 and died there on February 7, 1873. Kincaid was buried in Bellevue Cemetery, Danville, Kentucky.

References

1791 births
1873 deaths
Burials in Bellevue Cemetery (Danville, Kentucky)
Politicians from Danville, Kentucky
Members of the Kentucky House of Representatives
Jacksonian members of the United States House of Representatives from Kentucky
19th-century American politicians